The Fairlee Manor Camp House is a historic home located near Fairlee, Kent County, Maryland, United States. It is a "telescoping house" composed of a two-story, three-bay-long brick structure with a -story brick wing and a -story, 3-bay-long plank wing on each side in decreasing height and width. The oldest sections of the house date to 1825–1840. In 1953 Louisa d'Andelot Carpenter donated Fairlee Manor to the Easter Seal Society for Crippled Children and Adults of Delaware, Inc.

The Fairlee Manor Camp House was listed on the National Register of Historic Places in 1973.

References

External links
, including undated photo, at Maryland Historical Trust

Houses on the National Register of Historic Places in Maryland
Houses in Kent County, Maryland
Houses completed in 1840
National Register of Historic Places in Kent County, Maryland